Lakeview is a small residential community in the Halifax Regional Municipality that located approximately 20 minutes outside of Halifax Peninsula Nova Scotia.  It consists of one street (off the Cobequid Rd.) plus a small subdivision.

While Lakeview is mainly residential, several organizations are located on the street.  These include Teak Tree Enterprises, Shawn Ryder Digital and Halifax Regional Search and Rescue.

The community's small playground, park and beach are staffed by locals.

Surrounding Lakeview are the communities of Fall River, Waverley, Lower Sackville and Windsor Junction.

References
Explore HRM

Communities in Halifax, Nova Scotia
General Service Areas in Nova Scotia